Outing is an unincorporated community in Crooked Lake Township, Cass County, Minnesota, United States, near Emily.  It is situated between North Roosevelt Lake, South Roosevelt Lake, and Lawrence Lake.

The community is located between Crosby and Remer near the junction of State Highway 6 (MN 6) and Cass County Road 58.

The Land O'Lakes State Forest and the Clint Converse campground on Washburn Lake are both nearby.

It is part of the Brainerd Micropolitan Statistical Area.

Local volunteers Sarah Fairbanks and Jamie Prax upgraded the storm sirens for the community of Outing in November 2007.

References

External links
 Outing, Minnesota – Chamber of Commerce

Unincorporated communities in Cass County, Minnesota
Unincorporated communities in Minnesota
Brainerd, Minnesota micropolitan area